John Obayuwana is a Nigerian businessman, owner and managing director of Polo Luxury Limited, a company dealing in jewelry, timepieces, writing instruments and accessories.

Career 
Obayuwana began his business career in 1991, when he established Polo Luxury Limited headquartered in Lagos, Nigeria selling Fendi and Patek Philipe watches. Later, Obayuwana included over 20 other Swiss watch brands and expanded to West African region. He is the sole partner of brands such as Rolex, Gucci, Hublot and Dolce & Gabbana for West Africa. In May 2022, Switzerland honoured him with Swiss Learning Excellence Award for deepening Nigeria-Switzerland business relationship.

References 

Living people
Nigerian businesspeople
Nigerian business executives
Year of birth missing (living people)